The 2014–15 San Miguel Beermen season was the 40th season of the franchise in the Philippine Basketball Association (PBA).

Key dates
August 2: Leo Austria was named as the head coach of the San Miguel Beermen. Coach Biboy Ravanes was demoted to assistant coach and active consultant Todd Purves will have a minimal role with the team. 
August 24: The 2014 PBA Draft took place in Midtown Atrium, Robinson Place Manila.

Draft picks

Rosters

Philippine Cup

Eliminations

Standings

Game log

Playoffs

Bracket

Commissioner's Cup

Eliminations

Standings

Game log

Playoffs

Bracket

Governors' Cup

Eliminations

Standings

Game log

Playoffs

Bracket

Transactions

Trades

Pre-season

Draft day

Philippine Cup

Commissioner's Cup

Recruited imports

References

San Miguel Beermen seasons
San Miguel